The Institute for the Ukrainian Language of the NAS of Ukraine is a research organization in Ukraine created to do thorough studying of the Ukrainian language. It is the Ukrainian coordinating center of research issues in the Ukrainian language. An activity of importance to the Institute is to consolidate the Ukrainian language as the official language in the lingual space of Ukraine, to reach the lingual harmony in the life of present-day civil society.

Institute for the Ukrainian language was formed in 1991 and is located at the building of the Institute of History of Ukraine on Hrushevsky Street, in Kyiv. Director of the institute is a doctor of philology, professor Pavlo Hrytsenko who is assisted by a corresponding member of the NAS of Ukraine, doctor of philology, professor Vasyl Nimchuk, a corresponding member of the NAS of Ukraine, doctor of philology, professor Ivan Vyhovanets, corresponding member of the NAS of Ukraine, doctor of philology, professor Svitlana Yermolenko.

Core activities
The main delineated activity is to research the Ukrainian language as a social, structural, historical, regional national-and-cultural phenomenon.
Directions of the Ukrainian language investigations:
 social status, functions;
 structure of standard language system – vocabulary, grammar, standardization and codifications on every language level;
 social, professional and regional differentiation;
 origin traces and development history;
 contacts with other languages in different periods;
 forming and dynamics of Ukrainian onomastics;
 development of terminology subsystems.
A lot of institute projects were implemented in cooperation with specialists from other countries. Institute workers are studying the Ukrainian dialects within the international research project «The Slavic Linguistic Atlas», collaborating with institutions of academies of all the Slavic countries and Germany. They also cooperate with scientists from European countries within a project «The Linguistic Atlas of Europe» (Prof. Pavlo Hrytsenko). Some research workers of the Institute were co-executors of a project by International Committee of Slavists «Najnowsze dzieje języków slowiańskich» (Opole, Poland). As a result is a research « Ukrainska mova 1945-1995» (1999) (Prof. Svitlana Yermolenko).

Publishing
Another core activity is publishing of science and popular science periodicals:
 "Ukrainian language", a theoretical science journal for issue in all linguistic branches of Ukrainian language;
 "Culture of a word", a popular science journal for issues in language standardizations and stylistics;
 "Lexicography Bulletin", a science journal for issues in lexicography and lexicology;
 "Studies in Onomastics and Etymology", a proceeding for issues in onomastics and etymology;
 "Terminology Bulletin", a science journal for issues in terminology.

References
Home page
Department of Scientific Terminology of the Institute for the Ukrainian Language

Ukrainian language
Institutes of the National Academy of Sciences of Ukraine
1991 establishments in Ukraine
NASU department of literature, language and art studies
Universities and colleges in Kyiv
Research institutes in Kyiv
Ukrainian studies journals
Language regulators